Events from the year 1833 in Sweden

Incumbents
 Monarch – Charles XIV John

Events

 Pilt Carin Ersdotter arrives to Stockholm where she attracts great attention as The beautiful Dalarna girl.
 - Törnrosens bok by Carl Jonas Love Almqvist

Births
 21 March - Carl Stål, entomologist specialising in Hemiptera   (died 1878) 
 11 April  - Fredrik von Otter, Prime Minister  (died 1910) 
 July 24  - Gustaf Åkerhielm, Prime Minister (died 1900) 
 21 October - Alfred Nobel, chemist, engineer, innovator, and armaments manufacturer (died 1896) 
 10 December - Ellen Anckarsvärd, women's rights activist (died 1898)
 Rosalie Sjöman, photographer  (died 1919)

Deaths
 28 May - Johann Christian Friedrich Hæffner, composer (born 1759) 
 1 June - Rudolf Cederström, naval commander  (born 1764) 
 24 July - Hedda Wrangel, composer  (born 1792)
 Johan Anton Lindqvist, theatre director (born 1759)

References

 
Years of the 19th century in Sweden
Sweden